The Green Grass of Home (Traditional Chinese: 緣來自有機) is a TVB modern drama series broadcast in June 2007.

Synopsis
Stella Yip Moon-Chi (Christine Ng) is an interior designer who works as the head of her business' team, but is demanding, high-strung, and treats her staff badly.  When her secretary tells Stella's boss about Stella's stress related health problems, Stella is fired. She ends up meeting Choi Ka-Sing (Sunny Chan), her dream man, a mellow and easy-going man working as a utility man, and learning to relax.

At the same time, Stella's family struggles with problems of their own. Stella's younger sister, Yip Moon-Lam (Mimi Lo), and her husband, Hung Kwok-Wai (Wong Chi Yin), are selfish and opportunistic, taking advantage of everyone, including Stella's father, Yip Cheung-Fat (Yuen Wah) and her older brother, Yip Shang-Shing (Makbau Mak)'s family; Stella's sister-in-law, Chu Lai-Ngoh (Kingdom Yuen) is constantly suspicious of Stella's younger sister's motives and they argue all the time. Stella's father, finally tired of trying mediate his unstable family, is befriended by Choi Ka-Sing and moves back to the countryside, where he becomes friends with Choi Ka-Sing's family.  At the same time, Choi Ka-Sing's shy younger brother, Choi Ka-Bo (Lai Lok-yi), becomes infatuated with a passionate environmental activist, Yung Wai-Yu (Natalie Tong), who ends up being the younger sister of an affluent businessman at the company where Stella's brother-in-law works.

Cast

Viewership ratings

Awards and nominations
40th TVB Anniversary Awards (2007)
 "Best Drama"
 "Best Actor in a Leading Role" (Sunny Chan - Choi Ka-Sing)
 "Best Actress in a Leading Role" (Christine Ng - Stella Yip Moon-Chi)
 "My Favourite Male Character Role" (Sunny Chan - Choi Ka-Sing)
 "My Favourite Female Character Role" (Christine Ng - Stella Yip Moon-Chi)

References

External links
TVB.com The Green Grass at Home - Official Website 
K for TVB.net The Green Grass at Home - Episodic Synopsis and Screen Captures 

TVB dramas
2007 Hong Kong television series debuts
2007 Hong Kong television series endings